Wrestling was one of the sports which was held at the 1978 Asian Games in Bangkok, Thailand between 11 and 14 December 1978. The competition included only men's freestyle events.

Medalists

Medal table

References
 Freestyle result

External links
UWW Database

 
1978 Asian Games events
1978
Asian Games
1978 Asian Games